Sin vergüenza may refer to:

 Sin vergüenza (TV series), a 2007 Spanish-language telenovela
 Sin vergüenza (film), a 2001 film by Joaquín Oristrell
 Sin Vergüenza (Bacilos album), 2004
 Sin Vergüenza (116 album)